Gary Robert Warren (born 16 August 1984) is an English footballer who plays as a defender for Clachnacuddin. He is also Head of Professional Academy at Ross County.

Club career
Warren's football career began at Mangotsfield United in the Southern League, for whom he played between 2002 and 2006. He rose up through the youth & reserve ranks to the first team and made his debut for Mangotsfield away to Evesham United on 1 April 2003. He played a pivotal role in the team's 2004–2005 Southern League – Western Division championship-winning side. His career record with Mangotsfield totalled 164 appearances with 11 goals. 
In the summer transfer window of 2006, Warren went on trial at Bristol Rovers, with a view to permanent contract, but he eventually opted to join Team Bath.

Warren captained Team Bath to play-off promotion and played a pivotal part in the university's rise to conference football. Team Bath folded in his last year and Warren then joined Newport County after interest from a number of clubs including Hereford.

Newport County
In July 2009, following the disbandment of Team Bath, Warren signed for Newport County, then in the Conference South. He made his debut in a friendly match against Mansfield Town on 19 July 2009. Warren was immediately a regular for Newport and was appointed captain. In the 2009–10 season Newport County were crowned Conference South champions with a record 103 points, 28 points ahead of second-placed Dover Athletic.

During this time Warren was handed the Conference South player of the year.

In the 2010–11 season, Warren was linked with a move to a number of clubs including Blackpool, then managed by Ian Holloway and also a £10k move to League Two side Cheltenham Town. This bid was rejected, with manager Anthony Hudson criticising Cheltenham for their offer, describing it as a 'insult'. Hudson also insisted the club had no plans to sell Warren.

During Warren's time at Newport he was selected for Great Britain in 2009 in Serbia and in China (Shenzhen) 2011 where he finished top scorer and in 4th place and as a silver medalist.

On 12 May 2012, Warren played for Newport in the FA Trophy Final at Wembley Stadium – a match they lost 2–0 to York City.

Inverness Caledonian Thistle
At the end of the 2011–12 season, Warren's contract at Newport expired. Despite being offered a new contract he chose to move on to Inverness Caledonian Thistle. For Newport, Warren's departure was the end-of-an-era as he was the last of Dean Holdsworth's team to depart. Upon joining Inverness, Warren said he signed for the club because he 'couldn't say no' to playing under manager Terry Butcher.

In the opening game of the season, Warren made his debut in a 2–2 draw against St Mirren. Two-months later on 22 December 2012, he scored his first goal for Inverness in a 4–1 win over Dundee. In the quarter-final of the Scottish League Cup, he scored his second goal for Inverness in a 3–0 win over Rangers, helping the club to reach the semi-final. In the first part of the season, Warren and his teammates struggled as the club found themselves near the foot of the table, but the fans soon began to see the best of him. His second league goal came in a 3–2 win over Aberdeen on 27 November 2012, followed up two-weeks later when he scored in a 4–4 thriller against Dundee United. In late December 2012, Warren said his future in Scotland was uncertain due to personal issues. However, three-months later, he signed a new two-year deal. Prior to signing the new contract, Warren scored a 'brace' as Inverness beat Heart of Midlothian 3–2.

The 2013–14 season started positively for Warren. Alongside Josh Meekings in central defence and new goalkeeper Dean Brill, he helped Inverness keep three consecutive clean sheets in their opening matches, before eventually conceding in a 2–2 draw against Celtic on 24 August 2013. In October, Warren scored his first goal of the season, a header, in a 2–1 loss against Partick Thistle. He then scored in the next match, equalising against Dundee United in the quarter-final of the Scottish League Cup. Inverness CT won through after extra-time to reach the semi-finals. However, in the semi-final against Hearts, he was sent-off. Despite this, Inverness CT won in a penalty-shootout, but Warren's dismissal meant he missed the final through suspension. An attempt to overturn his ban was unsuccessful. On 22 February 2014, he scored in a 1–0 win over St Johnstone, giving Inverness their first victory in Perth in three years. Warren watched from the sidelines in the Scottish League Cup Final against Aberdeen, as Inverness lost 4–2 in the penalty shoot-out. Following this, he made his return to the first team, making forty appearances and scoring three times in all competitions. In May 2014, Warren signed a further contract extension, committing himself to the club until 2017.

The 2014–15 season started positively for Warren. Alongside Josh Meekings in central defence, Warren enjoyed the club's playing style saying it made him a better player. Warren then scored his first Inverness goal on 8 November 2014, in a 4–2 win over Hamilton Academical. He scored his second goal of the season, in a 4–1 win against St Mirren in a fourth round replay in the fourth round replay Scottish Cup, on 2 December 2014. Warren was then sent-off in the last minute of the match against Dundee United after being involved in an incident with Nadir Çiftçi, in a 1–1 draw on 24 February 2015. He was again unfortunate to be suspended for the final of the Scottish Cup, after picking-up a caution in the semi-final against Celtic. After the match, Warren expressed his disappointment that he would be unable to play in a final again, though he accepted the decision. Despite this, Warren assisted a goal for Meekings for the first before scoring the third goal of the game himself, in a 3–0 win over Dundee United. Once again, Warren watched from the sidelines, as Inverness Caledonian Thistle won 2–1 against Falkirk to win the final for the first time. Following the match, Warren celebrated with his teammates and was given a medal. Warren went on to make forty-one appearances, scoring three times in all competitions. He continued to be a stalwart in the side in the following seasons, establishing himself as a club legend.

After being suspended for both the Scottish League Cup and Scottish Cup, Warren was finally able to play in his first cup final, captaining the club in the Challenge Cup final against Dumbarton He put in a solid performance as the club won 1–0 and he was able to lift the cup as club captain.

Yeovil Town 
Warren was informed that Inverness may not be able to keep him, as his wages were too high and the club had to cut back on costs after a reduced parachute payment after their failed attempt in promotion back to top flight. His exit was not instantaneous, as he was told he could stay on if no club came forward for him. On 28 June 2018, Warren's contract with Inverness was terminated by mutual consent to allow him to join League Two side Yeovil Town on a free transfer. In June 2019, after a campaign disrupted by injury Warren left Yeovil after having his contract terminated by mutual consent.

Exeter City 
On 28 June 2019, Warren joined League Two side Exeter City on a free transfer. On 9 January 2020, Warren joined Torquay United on loan from Exeter City. He was recalled by Exeter on 11 February 2020 and played in the EFL Trophy semi-final against Portsmouth. Warren was released by Exeter City at the end of the 2019–20 season.

Non-League 
In July 2021, Warren joined Southern Football League Premier Division South club Tiverton Town, already at the club as manager of Under-18s. Warren left both of his roles at the club in June 2022 to move back to Scotland.

Clachnacuddin 
On 19 June 2022, Warren returned to Inverness, and signed for Highland League side, Clachnacuddin on a one year deal.

Coaching career
In July 2022, having returned to Scotland to join Highland League side Clachnacuddin, Warren was appointed onto the Academy Coaching Team of Ross County, joining as Head of Professional Academy.

Career statistics

Honours
Newport County
Conference South: 2009–10

Inverness Caledonian Thistle
Scottish Cup: 2014–15
Scottish Challenge Cup: 2017–18:

References

External links
 

1984 births
Living people
Footballers from Bristol
English footballers
Association football defenders
Mangotsfield United F.C. players
Team Bath F.C. players
Newport County A.F.C. players
Inverness Caledonian Thistle F.C. players
Yeovil Town F.C. players
Exeter City F.C. players
Torquay United F.C. players
Tiverton Town F.C. players
Clachnacuddin F.C. players
English Football League players
National League (English football) players
Scottish Premier League players
Scottish Professional Football League players
Highland Football League players
Southern Football League players
Universiade silver medalists for Great Britain
Universiade medalists in football
Medalists at the 2011 Summer Universiade
Ross County F.C. non-playing staff